Maksar-e Sofla (also Romanized as Maksar-e Soflá; also known as Magsar, Magsar-e Soflá, and Maksar-e Pā’īn) is a village in Jarahi Rural District, in the Central District of Mahshahr County, Khuzestan Province, Iran. At the 2006 census, its population was 119, in 19 families.

References 

Populated places in Mahshahr County